Lee Gwang-ik (born 27 May 1969) is a South Korean athlete. He competed in the men's decathlon at the 1988 Summer Olympics.

References

1969 births
Living people
Athletes (track and field) at the 1988 Summer Olympics
South Korean decathletes
Olympic athletes of South Korea
Place of birth missing (living people)